The Independent Church was organized in 1832 in Kirtland, Ohio as a schism in the Church of Christ (Latter Day Saints).  Little is known about this second schismatic sect of the Latter Day Saint movement apart from the date of establishment, the surname of its founder, and that Hoton denounced Joseph Smith Jr. and the Book of Mormon.  Hoton's movement self-destructed when he and his bishop had disagreements.

See also
History of the Latter Day Saint movement
List of sects in the Latter Day Saint movement

References

Further reading
Steven L. Shields, Divergent Paths of the Restoration:  A History of the Latter Day Saint Movement, Restoration Research, Los Angeles: 1990, p. 29.

Christian denominations established in the 19th century
Defunct Latter Day Saint denominations
Latter Day Saint movement in Ohio
Organizations based in Ohio
Pre–succession crisis denominations in the Latter Day Saint movement
Religious organizations established in 1832
1832 establishments in Ohio
Kirtland, Ohio